Lilian G. Lutter (6 January 1899? – 18 June 1980) was a British educationist who spent most part of her career in India. She was the founder principal of the Maharani Gayatri Devi Girls' Public School, the first all Girls school in the state of Rajasthan, an institution founded by Gayatri Devi of Jaipur with 24 students in 1943. She was honoured by the Government of India in 1970 with Padma Shri, the fourth highest Indian civilian award.

See also

 Maharani Gayatri Devi Girls' Public School

References

Recipients of the Padma Shri in literature & education
British educational theorists
Founders of Indian schools and colleges
Women educational theorists
20th-century British people
British schoolteachers
Scholars from Rajasthan
Year of birth missing
1980 deaths